Port Richmond High School is a public high school on the North Shore of Staten Island, New York City, New York. It is located in the Elm Park neighborhood, at 85 St Josephs Avenue between Innis Street and Charles Avenue. It has approximately 100 full-time teachers and a student-to-teacher ratio of 21.5.

There are periods 0–9 in this school. Freshmen and Sophomores are usually 1–8. Period 0 is used for JROTC and college prep classes. The Gateway to Higher Education, Collegiate, Culinary Arts, JROTC, Medical Technology, TV Media, as well as several other programs are located in the school.

History 
The school was founded in 1928.

On June 25, 2018, Oneatha Swinton was removed from her position as principal after being charged with insurance fraud. She was accused of ending the honors program, misappropriation of the school budget, cronyism, as well as various other charges by the staff, parents and the community.

Demographics 
The school is diverse, at 24.3% White, 30.6% Black, 7.0% Asian, and 37.8% Hispanic. Over half of the students receive a free or discounted lunch. In 2011–12, the school has significantly more freshman students than any other grade — nearly twice as many freshman as sophomores, and nearly half the total population is freshmen; juniors and seniors (combined) represented only one-third of the population.

National Honors Society (ARISTA)
Any student in the third or fourth year who has attained an average of 90% or over the preceding year, and has met the service requirements by giving service to the school and the community is eligible for nomination to the National Honors Society. An overall average below ninety will result in probation and eventually removal from the program.

Notable alumni
Jeffrey Citron, Chairman of Vonage  
Reinaldo Marcus Green, filmmaker
David Johansen, aka Buster Poindexter, singer/songwriter, founder New York Dolls
Steven Matteo, New York City Councilman
Debi Rose, New York City Councilwoman. She was Vice President of her senior class.
Peter Rossomando, American football coach
Bill Shakespeare, College Football Hall of Famer
Jeff Stoutland, offensive line coach for the Philadelphia Eagles of the National Football League (NFL)
Paul Zindel, Author

References

External links

Public high schools in Staten Island

1928 establishments in New York City
Educational institutions established in 1928